Aaichiyeh is a village in Jezzine District in Southern Lebanon. It is located 82 kilometers far from Beirut and on altitude of 750 meters, and is accessible by the roads of Nabatieh-Jezzine and Marjayoun-Jezzine. Its population is approximately 4000 people as of 2008.

Etymology
The name "aïchiye" (العيشية )  goes back to the word "live", which is the symbol of comfortable living and the surrounding pine trees and nature.

Religious sites
There are 2 churches in Aïchiye: Mar Antonios (مار انطونيوس) Church, and the Church of the Lady (السيدة العذراء). They were built prior to the Lebanese Civil war (1975-1990) and were both renovated at the conclusion of the conflict.

Agriculture and nature 
Aichiyeh's soil is fertile, which makes its inhabitants dependent on raising livestock, bees, chickens, and growing olives and fruits such as grapes, peaches and apricots. The spring provides irrigation of cultivated lands. In the past, the villagers planted tobacco, a widespread crop at the time. Aïchiye is known for its abundance in oak and pine trees

History
Phoenician vases were found, indicating a previous Phoenician settlement. The Aichiyeh massacre in 1976 inflicted by Palestinian militias killed many men and depopulated the village for the time being, until a portion of its residents came back to settle in their homes following the conflict.
Today, Aichiyeh's people strongly support the lebanese armed forces with good and strong relations between them .

During the Israeli occupation of southern Lebanon the IDF had an army base in Aichiyeh. On 6 August 1994 two Israeli soldiers were killed by Hizbollah in Aichiyeh.

References

External links
Aaychiyeh, Localiban

References

Populated places in the Israeli security zone 1985–2000
Maronite Christian communities in Lebanon
Populated places in Jezzine District